Aleksandr Kurochkin (Cyrillic: Александр Курочкин; born 23 July 1961) is a retired Kazakhstani sprinter specialising in the 400 metres who competed for the Soviet Union. He took part at the 1987 World Championships reaching the semifinals. In addition, he won the bronze medal at the 1984 Friendship Games which were a competition for countries boycotting the 1984 Summer Olympics. He also won several medals with the Soviet 4 × 400 metres relay.

His personal bests in the event are 45.52 outdoors (Moscow 1984) and 47.86 seconds indoors (Moscow 1986). The first result is the standing Kazakhstani record.

International competitions

1Did not finish in the final

References

1961 births
Living people
Kazakhstani male sprinters
Soviet male sprinters
World Athletics Championships athletes for the Soviet Union
European Athletics Championships medalists
Goodwill Games medalists in athletics
Competitors at the 1986 Goodwill Games
Universiade medalists in athletics (track and field)
Universiade gold medalists for the Soviet Union
Friendship Games medalists in athletics